Hassan El Shafei (born 9 October 1982) is an Egyptian record producer and media personality, el-Shafei was distinguished by his modern style in choosing music. He also cooperated with important names in the music world from all the Arab countries. He was known in Egypt for being a music producer and won the best music producer award at the Middle East Music Awards in 2009.

Biography 
Winner of the Middle East music award for Best Music Producer in 2009 and DG magazine's award for Best Music Arranger in 2007 and 2009, 28-year-old Hassan El Shafei is on a rocking roll. With memorable number one hits to his name, El Shafei has produced and arranged for Amr Diab, Hossam Habib, Angham, Sherine, Abdel Mejid Abdallah and Nancy Ajram. His unique music productions have quickly gained popularity in the Middle East, Europe and the US And after founding his own record label – The Basement Records – El Shafei now has his sights set on revolutionising the way music in the Middle East is produced; giving big stars a music makeover while paving the way for talented young artists to introduce something fresh into the local market. He founded the genre-blending Basement Records label in 2010 with his business partner Mohamed El Shaer. An industry notable, he soon found TV superstardom as a judge on multiple seasons of Arab Idol, which premiered in 2011. In 2014, he was asked to contribute to the international FIFA World Cup-minded album Pepsi Beats of the Beautiful Game, the only Arab representative on a collection with Timbaland, Santigold, Janelle Monáe, and others. That same year, he released the summer Internet dance hit "Mayestahlushi" under his own name, featuring Abla Fahita.

See also 
Arab Idol

References

External links 
 

1982 births
Musicians from Cairo
Egyptian composers
Egyptian record producers
Living people